Keith Robertson (27 October 1938 – 17 October 2020 ) was a former Australian rules footballer who played for North Melbourne in the Victorian Football League (VFL) from 1957 to 1963. 

His two sons, Rohan and Shane also played for North Melbourne, making their VFL debuts on the same day in 1985.

References

External links

North Melbourne Football Club players
Australian rules footballers from Victoria (Australia)
1938 births
2020 deaths